The Book of Everything (Dutch: Het boek van alle dingen) is a children's novel by Dutch author Guus Kuijer, published in 2004 by Querido.

The book was awarded the Gouden Griffel literary award in 2005.

The English translation was published in 2006.

Plot summary

The book, set in Amsterdam, relates the tale of a nine-year-old boy named Thomas who see things no one else can, such as invisible hail that "ripped all the leaves from the trees", and tropical fish in the canal. Thomas lives in a family of four: his parents and his sister, Margot. They are not, however, a harmonious family, as their father repeatedly hits their mother, and punishes Thomas by beating him with a wooden spoon. He is a very religious man, but he fears embarrassment and is said to "not belong with people". Thomas writes down everything in his "Book of Everything", a diary which holds his thoughts.

Characters

Thomas
Thomas is the hero of the story. Although he is young, he knows a lot and is never afraid to ask questions. He has visions of Jesus and talks to him. He is said to be a good boy with a lovely personality. He says that "when I grow up, I'm going to be happy". In the prologue, the author asks the aged Thomas whether he became happy, and is answered, "Yes." Thomas has many friends in the book such as Eliza, a girl with a wooden leg and a hurt hand. Thomas writes her a love letter early in the book, and later tells Jesus that he will marry her, and receives the Lord's blessing.

Margot
Margot is Thomas's older sister. Thomas describes her as, "dumb as an onion," though much of her apparent stupidity is a farce. She has a way of knowing things. At a particularly violent point of the story, where the father is threatening to hurt Thomas and his mother, Margot grabs the carving knife and threatens Father with it, saying that "I've had it up to here". Thomas's respect for her grows as the story progresses. Thomas notes later in the story when Margot was looking dead into Father's eyes that she '...was no longer afraid, and I saw her become a witch before my very eyes.'

Father
Father has a very strict personality who does not believe in niceness or mercy, saying that "only good-for-nothings and weaklings are happy. Life is a struggle." He has shut himself off from people. He is shown to be a coward. He is a very religious man, raising his family up to what he thinks is God's standard.

Mother
Mother is very nice to her son Thomas. She hides the fact that her husband hits her. She often takes the blow for Thomas' mistakes. She agrees to starting the 'Reading Aloud' club with Mrs. van Amersfoort, which lets her and Thomas grow.

Mrs. van Amersfoort
Mrs. van Amersfoort is a war survivor who is said to be a witch. In the story a 'witch' is defined to be women who is no longer afraid. She has a very messy house and two black cats. Her husband was executed in World War II for being a part of the Resistance. She also helps Thomas to stop being afraid, and aids him when he starts to set up the Plagues of Egypt to scare Father, first by giving Thomas her cordial so he can dye his aquarium red like blood, and next by summoning a plague of frogs, until Thomas calls off the plagues. She learns from Thomas and helps him and his mother stand up to his father and go against his word. She is a very independent woman.

Eliza
Eliza is Margot's friend from school. She is sixteen. Thomas wrote her a letter explaining that he thought she was a beautiful girl. She has a leather leg that creaks when she walks, and a missing finger on her left hand. She helps Thomas grow and not be afraid anymore. Thomas notes that he will marry her when he is older. She is smart and is not afraid to showcase her amazement in Thomas.

Stage adaptation
The Book of Everything was adapted for the stage by Australian playwright Richard Tulloch. The adaptation was first produced by Company B Belvoir and Kim Carpenter’s Theatre of Image at Belvoir St Upstairs Theatre, Sydney, on 2 January 2010, with the following cast:

Margot: Alison Bell
Father / Bumbiter: Peter Carroll
Mrs. van Amersfoort: Julie Forsyth
Musician: Iain Grandage
Mother: Claire Jones
Aunty Pie: Deborah Kennedy
Jesus: John Leary
Eliza: Yael Stone
Thomas: Matthew Whittet
Director, Neil Armfield
Set & costume designer, Kim Carpenter
Composer, Iain Grandage
Lighting designer, Nigel Levings
Choreographer, Julia Cotton
Sound designer, Steve Francis

This production was nominated for Best Play at the 2010 Helpmann Awards.  The script was published in 2011 by Currency Press.  

The production was also performed off-Broadway at the New Victory Theater in New York City in 2012, and in Melbourne in 2013.

References

Dutch children's novels
2004 children's books
2004 novels
Novels set in Amsterdam
Dutch novels adapted into plays